Preoteşti or Preoţeşti may refer to several places in Romania:

Preoteşti, a village in Iancu Jianu Commune, Olt County
Preoţeşti, a village in Bălceşti town, Vâlcea County